Antonio Lombardo (c.1458–1516) was an Italian Renaissance sculptor.

Lombardo was born in Venice, the brother of Tullio Lombardo and son of Pietro Lombardo. The Lombardo family worked together to sculpt church decorations and tombs. He died in Ferrara, where he worked as marble master for Duke Alfonso I.  Lombardo also worked in bronze, and his output encompasses secular and mythological subjects as well as sacred pieces.  His 1505 marble relief of St. Anthony making a new-born child speak in defense of its mother's honor, in the Basilica of Saint Anthony of Padua, has been cited as his masterpiece.

References

Italian Renaissance sculptors
1450s births
1516 deaths
Republic of Venice artists
15th-century Italian sculptors
Italian male sculptors
16th-century Italian sculptors